SS James Eagan Layne was a liberty ship. She was beached and sunk during the Second World War off Whitsand Bay, Cornwall, United Kingdom.

History

Voyages and sinking
She was built by the Delta Shipbuilding Corporation, New Orleans, Louisiana in 1944 and was operated by the United States Navigation Company, of New York City.  She was named after the second engineer of the Esso Baton Rouge, who was killed when Esso Baton Rouge was sunk by Reinhard Hardegen's U-123 on 8 April 1942.

The final voyage of the James Eagan Layne was in convoy BTC-103 to carry 4,500 tons of US Army Engineers' equipment from Barry, Wales, to Ghent, in Belgium. She also carried motorboats and lumber as deck cargo.  She was sighted on 21 March 1945, sailing 12 miles off Plymouth by U-399 and torpedoed on the starboard side between holds #4 and #5.  She was badly damaged, but was taken in tow by tugs Flaunt and Atlas.  She was beached in Whitsand Bay Cornwall, but subsequently settled on the bottom and was declared a total loss.  There were no casualties amongst her crew of 69.

As a wreck

Some salvage was done at the time of her loss before the forward holds flooded and much of the cargo in the stern section was salvaged by an Icelandic firm in 1953 with further salvage work completed in 1967.

The wreck has been a popular dive site for many years. In June 2011, three divers got into difficulty on the wreck, resulting in one death.

March 2015 is the 70th anniversary of the sinking of the James Eagan Layne. To celebrate this anniversary, the Liberty 70 Project was started with the aim of researching and documenting all aspects of the life of this vessel - wartime transport, shipwreck, commercial salvage, the classic UK wreck dive and artificial reef.

References

External links
Totnes SAC
The Liberty 70 Project
Submerged
FourthElement 

Liberty ships
Wreck diving sites in England
World War II shipwrecks in the English Channel
Ships sunk by German submarines in World War II
Steamships
Cornish shipwrecks
Ships built in New Orleans
1944 ships
Maritime incidents in March 1945
Ships sunk with no fatalities
1945 in England